Río Grande de San Miguel is a river in southern El Salvador, Central America. 

References

Grande San Miguel
Usulután Department